Gregory Bevan Haddrick (7 September 1960) is an Australian-born Logie Award winning screenwriter and film and television producer. Over the last decade he has won six AWGIE Awards as a writer, two AFI Awards as a producer, and an International Emmy Award nomination as a writer and producer. In 2012, The Australian reported that: "If you've watched an Australian television drama in the past year, there's a one in two chance it was written by Greg Haddrick."

Early life
Haddrick is the younger child and only son of actor Ron Haddrick AM MBE. He was educated at Homebush Public School, where he was School Captain in 1972, and at Newington College (1973–78), where he was Senior Prefect in 1978. In 1982 he graduated with as a Bachelor of Arts (Honours, English) from the University of Sydney.

Film and television career
 Writer & Script Editor – Sons and Daughters
 First Writer – Home and Away
 Co-writer & Script Editor – Elly & Jools
 Co-writer of screenplay – The Magic Pudding feature film
 Writer – My Husband, My Killer
 Script editor of screenplay – The Potato Factory mini-series
 Script editor – Ihaka: Blunt Instrument telemovie
 Creator – MDA on ABC TV
 Producer – The Incredible Journey of Mary Bryant
 Co-writer – The Society Murders telemovie
 Co-producer & Writer – Underbelly
 Co-writer – Mirror, Mirror
 Producer – Cloudstreet
 Producer – Crownies
 Writer & Executive Producer – Janet King
 Writer – Bikie Wars: Brothers in Arms
 Writer – Tricky Business
 Creater & writer – Pine Gap (TV series)

Awards

 
</ref>

Publications
 Top Shelf 1: Reading and Writing the Best in Australian TV Drama   (Sydney, 2001)
 Top Shelf 2: Five Outstanding Television Screenplays  (Sydney, 2001)

References

External links
 The Incredible Journey of Mary Bryant - National Film and Sound Archive
 The Society Murders Review -The Age
 Underbelly - News report
 

1960 births
Australian film producers
Australian screenwriters
Australian television writers
Australian male television writers
Australian television producers
Living people
People from Sydney
People educated at Newington College